Estradiol benzoate/trenbolone acetate, sold under the brand names Synovex Choice, Synovex One, Synovex Plus, Synovex with Trenbolone Acetate, is an implantable combination medication of estradiol benzoate (EB), an estrogen, and trenbolone acetate, an androgen/anabolic steroid, which is used in veterinary medicine as a growth promoter for livestock. It is provided in the form of pellets of pure crystalline estradiol benzoate and trenbolone acetate and is administered by subcutaneous implantation at regular intervals.

See also
 Estradiol benzoate/progesterone
 Estradiol benzoate/testosterone propionate
 List of combined sex-hormonal preparations § Estrogens, progestogens, and androgens

References

Combined estrogen–androgen formulations